The gerbil mouse or long-eared mouse (Malacothrix typica) is a species of rodent in the family Nesomyidae. It is found in Angola, Botswana, Namibia, and South Africa. Its natural habitats are dry savanna, subtropical or tropical dry shrubland, hot deserts, and temperate deserts.

References

Dendromurinae
Mammals described in 1834
Taxonomy articles created by Polbot